Belinda Woolcock was the defending champion but lost in the first round to Paula Badosa, in a repeat of the previous year's final.

Maddison Inglis won the title, defeating Sachia Vickery in the final, 2–6, 6–3, 7–5.

Seeds

Draw

Finals

Top half

Bottom half

References

External links
Main Draw

Burnie International - Singles